Terrace Court is a historic apartment complex of three three-story buildings in Omaha, Nebraska. It was built in 1920 by the Drake Realty & Construction Co., and designed by architect B. Hene in Sullivanesque style. It has been listed on the National Register of Historic Places since July 2, 2008.

References

External links

	
National Register of Historic Places in Omaha, Nebraska
Residential buildings completed in 1920
1920 establishments in Nebraska